San Antonio de Cortés is a town, with a population of 5,509 (2013 census), and a municipality in the Honduran department of Cortés.

References

Municipalities of the Cortés Department